Thomas Wade (born May 9, 1961) is a Canadian country artist. He was the lead singer of the group Thomas Wade & Wayward, who released their eponymous debut album in 1996. The album produced seven singles on the Canadian country music chart, including the top 10s "Zero to Sixty" and "She's Getting Serious". Between 1997 and 1999, Thomas Wade & Wayward received seven CCMA awards, winning best group or duo three times, and both independent single and song awards for '97 and '98. The group was also nominated for three Juno Awards for Best Country Group or Duo in 1997, 1998 and 1999. Between 1996 and 2001, Wade placed twelve videos in the top twenty on CMT, including the number one "Lying Here with You'".

Wade launched a solo career in 2000 when he signed to Shoreline Records and released his debut album, Lucky 13. Five singles were released from the album, including the top 10 "Running Away with You". Following the release of a career retrospective in 2001, So Far, Wade was diagnosed with oromandibular dystonia. While he was forced to end his recording career, he has continued his career as a songwriter. Celine Dion included one of Wade's songs, "Come to Me", on her 2004 album Miracle. Due to cutting-edge work in neuroplasticity, Wade began to heal early in 2010 and as of May 2015 went into the studio to record a new album called Blue Country Soul at Phase One Studios in Toronto, Ontario. Largely co-written with Canadian songwriter Tim Taylor, this record is a return to Wade's musical roots, the music of the fifties, classic country and blues as well as a musical reunion with bassist John Dymond, keyboardist Steve O'Connor and drummer Gary Craig. As of 2016, Wade has been touring again as a headlining act. A book and a documentary is in production about his career and battle with dystonia.

Discography

Studio albums

Compilation albums

Singles

Music videos

References

1961 births
Canadian male singer-songwriters
Canadian country singer-songwriters
Living people
Canadian blues singers
Musicians from Ontario